Chaim Elazar Spira (December 17, 1868 – May 13, 1937) was a rebbe of the Hasidic Munkacs dynasty.

Family background
Spira was born in Strzyżów, Kingdom of Galicia and Lodomeria, Austria-Hungary, now part of Poland, where his grandfather, Shlomo Spira, was a rabbi. Chaim Elazar's father, Tzvi Hersh Spira, was from Spira family which had held rabbinical positions in Munkács dating back to the founder of the Munkács Hasidic dynasty, Tzvi Elimelech Spira of Dinov (Bnei Yisoschor), who was Chief Rabbi from 1828 to 1832.

Spira became Chief Justice of the Rabbinical Court in Munkács in 1903, where he worked along with his father until the latter died in 1913. He succeeded his father as Chief Rabbi of Munkács and the surrounding communities.

Biography
Spira wrote and published over twenty books on the Jewish law, Torah, Hasidism, and religious philosophy and customs including the six-volume Minchas Elazar. He opposed political Zionism and the Agudat Yisrael.

Spira established elementary schools under the name "Machzike Torah."

He founded a yeshiva (rabbinical college) in Munkacs, named Darchei Tshuva, after the title of his father's sefer (book).

Journey to Jerusalem

In 1930, Spira visited Palestine for a thirteen-day trip to visit the elderly kabbalist Solomon Eliezer Alfandari (known as the Saba Kadisha, "Holy Grandfather") and also to visit with his followers in Palestine.

He met with Alfandari for long hours behind closed doors over the span of a week. While Spira was in Jerusalem Alfandari died.

Details of the trip were recorded in a book written by a disciple of Spira's, Moshe Goldstein, who was one of those accompanying the Rebbe on his trip. The book was reprinted several times in Hebrew and Yiddish, and was translated to English in 2009 by Artscroll Publications.

Wedding of daughter in 1933
Spira's only daughter,  
Chaya Fruma Rivka (known as Frima), married Baruch Yehoshua Yerachmiel Rabinowicz in Munkács on March 15, 1933.

Over 20,000 guests attended the wedding. According to the daily newspaper Rudý večerník, "The wedding lasted for seven days".

Legacy 

Spira died in 1937 and was succeeded as Chief Rabbi by his son-in-law Baruch Yehoshua Yerachmiel Rabinowicz, Spira's only daughter Frima's husband, who was chief rabbi until the Nazi occupation of Munkács in 1944.

Spira's gravesite in the Munkács Jewish Cemetery dresses pilgrims, especially on the anniversary of his death on the third day in the month of Sivan.

Today

The Munkacs Hasidic dynasty is now led by his grandson, Moshe Leib Rabinovich, who lives in Brooklyn.

Israel
Batei Munkacs, the Israeli  residential neighborhood founded by Spira, draws tourists.

References

Further reading

Aviezer Ravitzky, "Munkacs and Jerusalem: Ultra-Orthodox Opposition to Zionism and Agudaism," Zionism and Religion, eds. Shmuel Almog, Jehuda Reinharz, and Anita Shapira (Hanover and London, 1998), 67-89.

External links
 Rabbi Chaim Elazar Shapira – the Munkaczer Rebbe - A Jewish Community in the Carpathian Mountains- The Story of Munkács
 Video of the wedding of Chaya Frima Rivka Spira - daughter of Rabbi Chaim Elazar to Rabbi Baruch Rabinovich

1871 births
1937 deaths
20th-century Russian rabbis
Anti-Zionist Hasidic rabbis
Hungarian Orthodox rabbis
People from Strzyżów County
Polish Hasidic rabbis
Rabbis from Galicia (Eastern Europe)
Rebbes of Munkacs
Religious leaders in Hungary